Uttoxeter is a small village near Plympton–Wyoming, Ontario, Canada, that at one time had its own post office and some small businesses. It is named after the town of Uttoxeter in the United Kingdom. Most of the village no longer exists, but the name endures as a designation for a dispersed rural community around the original site. The church is now a private residence.

The former town of Forest is 12 km away, while the former village of Wyoming in Plympton–Wyoming is 15 km away.

History

Name
The village is named after the town of Uttoxeter in England, the name of which most likely means "Wuttuc's homestead on the heath". The village is also referred to as Uttoxeter, Ontario, to avoid confusion.

Transport

References

External links
 

Communities in Lambton County